Johan Christiaan "JC" Oberholzer (born 14 November 1989 in Krugersdorp) is a South African rugby union player, currently playing with the . His regular position is hooker.

Career

Youth and Varsity rugby

He played for the  side in 2008 and for the  side in 2009 and 2010.

He represented  in the 2010, 2011, 2012 and 2013 Varsity Cup seasons.

Leopards

He made his first class debut for the  during the 2010 Currie Cup Premier Division.

He only played Vodacom Cup rugby in 2011 and 2012, making two appearances in both competitions. One more appearance followed in the 2013 before a return to Currie Cup action saw him play three times during the 2013 Currie Cup First Division. He also played for the Leopards in 2014.

Eastern Province Kings

At the start of 2014, he joined Port Elizabeth-based side  on a trial, but returned to the  before the start of the 2014 Vodacom Cup.

References

South African rugby union players
Living people
1989 births
People from Krugersdorp
Leopards (rugby union) players
Rugby union players from Gauteng
Rugby union hookers